Cyril Chinedu Oriala (born 17 November 1981) is a track and field sprint athlete who competes internationally for Nigeria.

Oriala represented Nigeria at the 2008 Summer Olympics in Beijing. He competed at the 4x100 metres relay together with Obinna Metu, Onyeabor Ngwogu and Uchenna Emedolu. In their qualification heat they did not finish due to a mistake in the baton exchange and they were eliminated.

References

External links

1981 births
Living people
Olympic athletes of Nigeria
Athletes (track and field) at the 2008 Summer Olympics
Nigerian male sprinters
African Games gold medalists for Nigeria
African Games medalists in athletics (track and field)
Athletes (track and field) at the 1999 All-Africa Games